Upper Hand or The Upper Hand may refer to:

Books
The upper hand, by Stuart Hood 1987.
The upper hand, by John William Corrington	 1967

Film and TV
The Upper Hand (TV series) a British television sitcom 1990–1996 with Joe McGann, Diana Weston, Honor Blackman
The Upper Hand (film) (French : Du rififi à Paname) 1966 Jean Gabin, Gert Fröbe, George Raft, Nadja Tiller.
Upper Hand (2010)  Directed by Michael Nolan. With Bryan Massey

Music
"The Upper Hand", song by The Mighty Mighty Bosstones from The Magic of Youth  
"Upper Hand", song by LeAnn Rimes, composed by LeAnn Rimes / Troy Verges Family (LeAnn Rimes album)
"Upper Hand", song by Doug Gillard Composed by Doug Gillard
"Upper Hand", song by Ex Norwegian from Sketch (album)
"Upper Hand", song by Goldfinger (band) Open Your Eyes (Goldfinger album)
"Upper hand (Sexy mama)" single by Indra (singer) from the album "One Woman Show" released by Warner Music France
"Upper Hand", song by Sean T. from the album Straight from the Streets